Khodahafez Rafigh is a 1971 Iranian film. It was the debut feature by the Iranian director Amir Naderi, and starred Zakaria Hashemi, Jalal Pishvaian and Saeed Rad.

Plot 
The plot follows three friends, Jalal, Naser and Khosrow, who organize the burglary of a jewelry shop. This is suppose to be Naser's last crime before he marries. Greed, betrayal and revenge quickly overcome their friendship.

Cast
Saeed Rad
Zakaria Hashemi
Vajesta (Sussan Sarmadi)
Jalal Pishvaian
Irene Zazians

References

External links
 

1971 films
Iranian crime films
1970s Persian-language films
Films about revenge
Films directed by Amir Naderi